Samarium chloride may refer to:

 Samarium(III) chloride (samarium trichloride), SmCl3
 Samarium dichloride (samarium(II) chloride), SmCl2